Mordella ornata is a species of beetle in the family Mordellidae, which belongs to the superfamily Tenebrionoidea. It was discovered in 1878.

References

Beetles described in 1878
ornata